"Billy Don't Be a Hero" is a 1974 pop song that was first a UK hit for Paper Lace and then, some months later, a US hit for Bo Donaldson and The Heywoods. The song was written and composed by two British songwriters, Mitch Murray and Peter Callander.

Because the song was released in 1974, it was associated by some listeners with the Vietnam War, though the war to which it actually refers is never identified in the lyrics. It has been suggested that the drum pattern, references to a marching band leading soldiers in blue, and "riding out" (cavalry) refer to the American Civil War. For one of the band's performances on Top of the Pops they wore Union-style uniforms, as can be seen on YouTube and on 45 single record cover.

A young woman is distraught that her fiancé chooses to enlist with Army recruiters passing through the town, causing her to implore him:

The song goes on to describe how Billy is killed in action in a pitched battle after volunteering to ride out and seek reinforcements. In the end, the heartbroken woman throws away the official letter notifying her of Billy's "heroic" death.

Chart performances
Paper Lace's version of "Billy Don't Be a Hero" reached No. 1 in the UK on 16 March 1974, and did likewise in Australia, where it spent eight weeks at the top spot. The Bo Donaldson and the Heywoods version reached No. 1 in the U.S. on the Billboard Hot 100 on 15 June 1974, and was dubbed into French for Canada. The US version sold over three and a half million copies, and was awarded a gold disc by the R.I.A.A. in June 1974. The Bo Donaldson and the Heywoods version was a massive hit in Latin America and Japan as well, but it remained largely unknown elsewhere. Billboard ranked it as the No. 21 song for 1974.

Despite the song's popularity, it was poorly received, and it was voted No. 8 on Rolling Stone magazine's readers' poll of "10 Worst Songs of the 1970s".

Paper Lace version

Weekly charts

Year-end charts

Bo Donaldson & the Heywoods version

Weekly charts

Year-end charts

Use in media
The song features in the 1994 film The Adventures of Priscilla, Queen of the Desert.

In the pilot episode of Friends, Ross says "Do you know how long it's been since I've grabbed a spoon? Do the words 'Billy, don’t be a hero' mean anything to you?,” meaning a really long time.

Massive Attack's 1991 track Blue Lines (from the album of the same name) features the lyrics "Take a walk, Billy, don't be a hero".

John C. Reilly performed a disco cover of the song on the soundtrack for Walk Hard: The Dewey Cox Story and a full performance of the song is available on the deleted scenes for home video releases.

The Doug Anthony Allstars performed a comedic cover of this song, featuring the altered line, "Where did Billy's head go?" in place of "Billy, keep your head low."

Dav Pilkey, creator of Captain Underpants, named the hero of The Adventures of Super Diaper Baby Billy solely to make possible a passing homage to "Billy Don't Be a Hero".

See also
List of anti-war songs

References

External links
 
 

1974 debut singles
Paper Lace songs
Bo Donaldson and The Heywoods songs
Billboard Hot 100 number-one singles
Cashbox number-one singles
RPM Top Singles number-one singles
Number-one singles in Australia
UK Singles Chart number-one singles
Irish Singles Chart number-one singles
Anti-war songs
Songs about death
Songs about the military
Songs about soldiers
Songs written by Mitch Murray
Songs written by Peter Callander
1974 songs
Mercury Records singles
ABC Records singles